BMJ Quality & Safety is a peer-reviewed healthcare journal dealing with improving patient safety and quality of care. The journal was established in 1992 as Quality in Health Care (print: ,), subsequently became Quality & Safety in Health Care and obtained its current name in 2011. It co-owned with the Health Foundation and is published by BMJ Publishing Group. The editor-in-chief role is shared by Bryony Dean Franklin (UCL School of Pharmacy) and Eric J Thomas (University of Texas Health Science Center at Houston). Before them the co-editors in chief were Kaveh Shojania  (Sunnybrook Health Sciences Centre) and Mary Dixon-Woods (University of Cambridge).

Abstracting and indexing 
The journal is abstracted and indexed by Index Medicus/MEDLINE/PubMed, Current Contents, and Excerpta Medica/EMBASE.

References

External links 
 

Public health journals
BMJ Group academic journals
Monthly journals
English-language journals
Publications established in 1992